The livestreaming of crimes is a phenomenon in which people live stream criminal acts. Due to the fact publishing to social media is done with the intent of others viewing the published materials, it is often impossible to protect the privacy of the victims or people involved.

History 
In April 2016, Marina Lonina, age 18; and Raymond Gates, age 29, were arrested in Ohio, US on charges that Gates raped an underage friend of Lonina's while Lonina live streamed the crime on Periscope. The prosecutor pointed out that Lonina, who was taken advantage of by a much older man, had become "caught up" in her excitement over the number of "likes" she was getting, and is shown on screen "laughing and giggling". Joss Wright of the Oxford Internet Institute pointed out that, given the "volume of content being created and uploaded every day, [there] is almost no practical way to prevent content like this being uploaded and shared".

By May, The New York Times was including the Ohio Periscope rape as one of a series of recent cases in which crimes were live streamed. These included one in which a young woman in Égly, France, speaks via Periscope about her distress and suicidal thoughts and is apparently encouraged by viewers to kill herself, which she does by throwing herself under a train. Also included was the case of two teenagers who live stream themselves bragging and laughing as they beat up a drunken man in a bar in Bordeaux, France.

Types

Cybersex trafficking

Cybersex trafficking, also referred to as live streaming sexual abuse, involves sex trafficking and the live streaming of coerced sexual abuse and or rape on webcam. Victims are abducted, threatened, or deceived and transferred to "cybersex dens". The dens can be in any location where the cybersex traffickers have a computer, tablet, or phone with Internet connection. Perpetrators use social media networks, videoconferences, pornographic video sharing websites, dating pages, online chat rooms, apps, dark web sites, and other platforms. They use online payment systems and cryptocurrencies to hide their identities. Millions of reports of its occurrence are sent to authorities annually. New laws and police procedures are needed to combat this type of cybercrime.

Instances

2008
 8 June: A bystander livestreamed the Akihabara massacre on Ustream, attracting an audience of 2000 viewers. Another user also used Ustream to livestream the massacre's aftermath, including police and public response.

2016
1 August: Korryn Gaines of Randallstown, Maryland livestreamed her actions on Facebook and Instagram as she resisted arrest and started an armed standoff with the police, which ended with Gaines being fatally shot and her 5-year old son sustaining injuries to his face and arm after being hit by stray bullets.

2017
 3 January: A torture incident in Chicago, in which an 18-year-old mentally-disabled white male in Chicago, Illinois, US was filmed being physically and verbally abused by four Black individuals (two men and two women). The torture was live streamed by one of the women on Facebook and sparked massive controversy.
 Early January: An American woman taped her toddler to the wall and live streamed it on Facebook Live.
 21 January: In Uppsala, Sweden, two Afghan immigrants and one Swedish citizen live streamed the gang rape of a woman on Facebook.
 24 April: A Thai man killed his infant daughter before committing suicide.

2018
 26 August: A gunman shot 12 people during a video game tournament, killing two. The shooting was live-streamed by the event's Twitch stream.

2019
 15 March: Two mass shootings occurred at the Al Noor Mosque and the Linwood Islamic Centre in Christchurch, New Zealand, where 51 people were killed and 40 were injured by 28-year-old Brenton Harrison Tarrant. The first attack was live streamed by the shooter on Facebook Live for 17 minutes, and has been described by New Zealand Prime Minister Jacinda Ardern "to be one of the darkest days in New Zealand history". Following the shootings, Facebook announced restrictions on Facebook Live on those who posted violent extremist material.
 22 March: Vlad Christian Eremia, 26, stabbed a 77-year-old Catholic priest, Father Claude Grou in Saint Joseph's Oratory in Montreal, Quebec, Canada, and was captured on a live stream by Salt + Light Television.
 9 October: Stephan Balliet committed a shooting near a synagogue and kebab restaurant in Halle, Saxony-Anhalt, Germany, resulting in two dead and two others injured; the attack was livestreamed on Twitch.
 29 December: Keith Thomas Kinnunen opened fire at the West Freeway Church of Christ  in White Settlement, Texas, US fatally shooting two people before he was shot and killed by an armed member of the congregation. The shooting was live streamed on YouTube because the church live streamed its services.

2020
 8 February: Thai Army Sergeant Jakrapanth Thomma killed 30 and wounded 57 people in a mass shooting in Thailand. A portion of the shooting at the Terminal 21 Korat mall was live-streamed by the perpetrator on Facebook Live.
 20 May: Armando "Junior" Hernandez, a 20-year-old live streamed his attack at the Westgate Entertainment District in Glendale, Arizona, US where three people were wounded, on Snapchat.
 26 May: A man in Stamford, Connecticut live-streamed himself on Instagram on a highway overpass saying he thought people were following him. He then began to fire on passing vehicles on the road below.

2021
6 January: Far-right personality Anthime Gionet, better known as "Baked Alaska", took part in the storming of the U.S. Capitol and livestreamed the event on DLive.
23 March: Ahmad Al Aliwi Al-Issa (or Alissa), age 21, shot and killed 10 people in a mass shooting in Boulder, Colorado, US. A portion of the shooting at a King Soopers supermarket was live-streamed on YouTube by a bystander.
19 August: A 15-year-old student livestreamed himself via Twitch stabbing a faculty member at his secondary school in Eslöv, Sweden. The attacker used a head-mounted camera on a helmet to livestream the attack and wore body armour similar to Brenton Tarrant, who he had quoted in his manifesto.
20 August: 19-year-old Aidan Ingalls shot a man to death and critically injured his wife on the South Haven Pier in South Haven, Michigan. Ingalls then aimed his gunfire towards beach goers, a boat and a jet skier. Ingalls missed all of his shots targeting them, but clipped the jet ski before turning the gun on himself halfway down the pier. The entire shooting lasted around a minute and was captured on WWMT’s camera, which was being live-streamed on youtube. The clip from the stream has since been wiped from the internet.

2022
15 January: Malik Faisal Akram took multiple people hostage at Congregation Beth Israel, a Jewish synagogue in Colleyville, Texas, United States. A portion of the hostage-taking was livestreamed on the synagogue's Facebook account.
14 May: Payton S. Gendron killed 10 people and injured 3 others while livestreaming the shooting on Twitch, inside and in the parking lot of the Tops Friendly Markets in Buffalo, New York, US. Eleven of the 13 people shot were Black and the 2 others were White.
24 July: Brooklyn-based pastor Lamor Whitehead and his wife were robbed of more than $1,000,000 worth of jewelry during a live-streamed church service.
7 September: During a shooting spree in Memphis, Tennessee, Ezekiel Kelly, a 19-year-old male, live-streamed himself on Facebook Live entering an AutoZone store and critically wounding an employee.

See also
 Beheading video
 Christchurch Call to Action Summit
 Hurtcore
 Shooting of Robert Godwin, a 2017 case in which a video of the crime was posted online (but not live streamed) by the perpetrator
 Snuff film

References

External links
 Why rising numbers of criminals are using Facebook Live to film their acts
Crime by type
Dark web
Filmed killings
 
Violence